Isaac Mansoor (30 May 1929 – July 2006) was an Indian swimmer. He competed in men's 100 metre freestyle and the water polo tournaments at the 1948 Summer Olympics and the 1952 Summer Olympics.

References

External links
 

1929 births
2006 deaths
Swimmers from Mumbai
Indian male swimmers
Indian male freestyle swimmers
Indian male water polo players
Olympic swimmers of India
Olympic water polo players of India
Swimmers at the 1948 Summer Olympics
Swimmers at the 1952 Summer Olympics
Water polo players at the 1948 Summer Olympics
Water polo players at the 1952 Summer Olympics
Place of birth missing
Asian Games medalists in swimming
Asian Games medalists in water polo
Asian Games gold medalists for India
Asian Games bronze medalists for India
Swimmers at the 1951 Asian Games
Water polo players at the 1951 Asian Games
Medalists at the 1951 Asian Games
Indian emigrants to Israel
20th-century Indian people
21st-century Indian people